The Blue Mountain Bears were a minor league baseball team located in Walla Walla, Washington. They were members of the Class A Short Season Northwest League for a single season in 1983.

The franchise was then purchased by Bob and Margaret Bavasi, who moved the team west to Everett and operated as the Everett Giants for eleven seasons. With a switch of affiliation to the Seattle Mariners in 1995, they became the AquaSox.

History
From 1973 through 1982, the Walla Walla Padres were the Northwest League affiliate of the San Diego Padres, and the team was owned by Patrica Nelly. After years of declining attendance, the franchise was sold to New Jersey-based Big Six Sports. The new ownership group promptly moved the club west to Richland, and took the outfield fence with them. They rebranded as the Tri-Cities Triplets for 1983 and signed a player development contract with the Texas Rangers.

Seeking to enhance the Northwest League from six to eight teams to allow for improved travel, Commissioner Bob Freitas sought expansion. Along with Spokane, Walla Walla was tabbed as one of the expansion locations and Ohio businessman Peter C. Kern was awarded the franchise. In homage to Walla Walla baseball history, "Bears" was selected as the nickname. While that was familiar, the club elected the unique moniker "Blue Mountain" to provide a greater market appeal, a reference to the Blue Mountains that bisect the region. Due to the late finalization of the club, the Bears were unable to secure an affiliation with a major league team, and operated as an independent for the 1983 campaign.

Ballpark
The Bears played at multi-sport Borleske Stadium, located at 409 West Rees Avenue; the vintage venue is still in use today.

Team identity
The Blue Mountain Bears adopted a color scheme of Powder Blue, Red, Navy Blue, and White. On the field, the Bears were clad in powder blue uniforms. Unlike most teams who utilized powder blue as an alternative to road grey, the color was part of the Bears brand. Absent the traditional white and grey of baseball, the team donned the single powder blue uniform set for all games. Manufactured by Wilson, the jersey was a two button top with red/white/navy blue trim on the neck and sleeve ends. The jersey was embellished with a red on white on navy Blue script B applied in tackle twill. The back of the jersey featured a three-color number in Wilson block font.

In contrast to most teams wearing powder blue uniforms at the time, the Bears' pants utilized a belt similar to the Montreal Expos. The pants were trimmed with a navy blue/white/red stripe. The team wore red stirrups and belts, and capping off the uniform was a solid red hat with a two-color white, outlined in navy blue script B embroidered on the face.

Regular season

Season-by-season record

References

External links
 Stats Crew Blue Mountain Bears 1983
 Baseball Reference Walla Walla Teams
 Minor League Geek Unsolved Mystery

Defunct Northwest League teams
Walla Walla, Washington
Baseball teams established in 1983
Professional baseball teams in Washington (state)
Defunct baseball teams in Washington (state)
Baseball teams disestablished in 1983